Harald Sigvard Bakke (born 30 June 1882) was a Norwegian teacher and politician.

He was born in Halden to farmers Johan Edvard Bakke and Tilla Bolette Nordby. He graduated as cand.philol. in 1912, and lectured at various secondary schools, including Sandnes, Stavanger, Halden and Oslo. He was elected representative to the Storting for the periods 1925–1927, 1928–1930, 1931–1933 and 1934–1936, for the Conservative Party. He was a member of the municipal council of Halden from 1916 to 1934.

References

1882 births
Year of death missing
People from Halden
Norwegian schoolteachers
Østfold politicians
Conservative Party (Norway) politicians
Members of the Storting